Anthony Sagnella (born February 28, 1964) is a former American football defensive tackle in the National Football League for the Washington Redskins.  Sagnella played college football at Rutgers University. He is currently a health teacher and football coach at North Haven High School.

Sagnella served as one of the replacement players during the 1987 players strike. In 2018, he and other replacement players were recognized for their contributions to the team by receiving Super Bowl Rings.

References

1964 births
Living people
American football defensive linemen
Washington Redskins players
National Football League replacement players
Players of American football from New Haven, Connecticut